Talat Noi or Talad Noi is a historic neighbourhood in Bangkok. It roughly occupies the area of the sub-district of the same name in Samphanthawong District. On the periphery of Bangkok's Chinatown, Talat Noi has been home to various ethnic Chinese communities since soon after the foundation of Bangkok. Several historic buildings are found in the area, including the Holy Rosary Church, the Talat Noi Branch of Siam Commercial Bank, and the So Heng Tai Mansion. 

Talat Noi has a long history predating the founding of Bangkok. The first ethnic group to settle here were the Portuguese from Ayutthaya. They built a Portuguese church in 1786, today known as the Holy Rosary Church or, in Thai, Wat Kalawa. Later, other ethnic groups came to live in Talat Noi, not only Chinese but also Vietnamese and Khmer. The area was Bangkok's first port, and was where immigrants landed.

Talat Noi was the birthplace of Dr. Puey Ungphakorn, former Governor of the Bank of Thailand. He was influential in Thai society in the 1970s.

The name Talat Noi means 'little market'. It comes from the name of the daughter of Jao Sua Niam or Jay Sua Niam (เจ้าสัวเนียม, เจ๊สัวเนียม), a landowner in the past. So, Chinese who living here are often referred to in Thai term in Teochew dialect Tuk Luk Kia (ตั๊กลักเกี้ย)

Today, Talat Noi is a cultural attraction. Locals retain their form of speech, food, and folk beliefs as in the past. Houses and lanes are lathered with graffiti that makes the place popular with teenagers, hipsters, and foreign tourists who want to experience a traditional Chinese quarter. It is convenient to other attractions in the adjacent historic Bang Rak neighbourhood on Charoen Krung Road: Captain Bush Lane and House No.1, the Old Customs House, Bangkok General Post Office, and Assumption Cathedral. 

Talat Noi is origin of the kuaitiao khua kai (ก๋วยเตี๋ยวคั่วไก่), a popular stir-fried noodle dish. It was adapted from dried chicken congee during World War II.

See also
Kudi Chin – Thai-Chinese-Portuguese community with a similar history in Thonburi.

References

Neighbourhoods of Bangkok
Samphanthawong district
Chinese-Thai culture
Tourist attractions in Bangkok
Subdistricts of Bangkok
Populated places on the Chao Phraya River
Historic districts in Thailand